Delaware Lake is a small lake north of Long Eddy in Delaware County, New York. It drains south via an unnamed creek which flows into Hoolihan Brook. It was once referred to as Perch Pond

See also
 List of lakes in New York

References 

Lakes of New York (state)
Lakes of Delaware County, New York